The Diocese of Sezze was a Latin Catholic bishopric with see in Sezze, in the Province of Latina, central Italy, about  south of Rome and  from the Mediterranean coast..

History
The Diocese of Sezze was established in 790 AD.

From 17 January 1217 it was in personal union (aeque principaliter) with the Diocese of Terracina, until both sees saw  their titles and territories merged on 1986.09.30 into the Diocese of Latina–Terracina–Sezze–Priverno.

Episcopal ordinaries
(all Roman Rite)

Suffragan Bishops of Sezze 
 Stefano (1036 – ?)
 Pollidio (1046 – ?)
 Drusino (1118 – ?)
 Alessandro (1122 – ?)
 Landone (1179 – 1180)
 Ugone (1180 – 1195), already Bishop of Terracina (Italy) (1168 – 1195), also Bishop of Priverno (Italy) (1180 – 1195)
 Tedelgario (1195 – 1203), also Bishop of Terracina (Italy) (1195 – 1203) and Bishop of Priverno (Italy) (1195 – 1203)
 Simeone (1203 – 1224), Bishop of Terracina (Italy) (1203 – 1224) and Bishop of Priverno (Italy) (1203 – 1224)
 
For further incumbents from 1217, see Diocese of Terracina, being identical due to personal union of their sees.

References

External links 
 GCatholic with incumbent bio links 

Former Roman Catholic dioceses in Italy